The Apostolic Nunciature to Senegal is the diplomatic mission of the Holy See to Senegal. The Apostolic Nuncio to Senegal is an ecclesiastical office of the Catholic Church in Senegal, with the rank of an ambassador. The nuncio serves both as the ambassador of the Holy See to the Republic of Senegal and as the point-of-contact between the Catholic hierarchy in Senegal and the pope.

On 9 July 1959, Jean-Marie Maury was named Apostolic Delegate to Dakar, a jurisdiction established in 1948 to provide representation of the Holy See in French colonial Africa. The title of that position changed to Apostolic Delegate to Western Africa on 23 September 1960 with responsibility for Senegal, Upper Volta, Cote d'Ivoire, Dahomey, Guinea, Mauritania, Niger, Sudan, Togo, Ghana, Gambia, and Sierra Leone. He continued to hold that delegate's title when given his new position for Senegal on 28 December 1961.

List of papal representatives to Senegal 
Apostolic Internuncios 
Jean-Marie Maury (28 December 1961 – 11 June 1965)
Apostolic Pro-Nuncios 
Giovanni Benelli (11 June 1966 – 29 June 1967)
Giovanni Mariani (16 October 1967 – 11 January 1975)
Luigi Barbarito (5 April 1975 – 10 June 1978)
Luigi Dossena (24 October 1978 – 30 December 1985)
Pablo Puente Buces (15 March 1986 – 31 July 1989)
Antonio Maria Vegliò (21 October 1989 - 2 October 1997)
Apostolic Nuncios 
Jean-Paul Gobel (6 December 1997 – 31 October 2001)
Giuseppe Pinto (4 December 2001 – 6 December 2007)
Luis Mariano Montemayor (19 June 2008 – 22 June 2015)
Michael Banach (19 March 2016 – 3 May 2022)
Waldemar Stanisław Sommertag (6 September 2022 – present)

References

Senegal
 
Holy See–Senegal relations
Vatican City